Jesse Lee Shibley, known as Arkie Shibley (21 September 1914 – September 1975) was an American country singer who recorded the original version of "Hot Rod Race" in 1950.  The record was important because "it introduced automobile racing into popular music and underscored the car's relevance to American culture, particularly youth culture."

Shibley was born in Van Buren, Arkansas, United States.  After relocating he acquired the nickname "Arkie" and, around 1948, began hosting a regular country music show on radio station KBRG in Bremerton, Washington.

Although the writing credit for "Hot Rod Race" is given to George Wilson, this may be Shibley's pseudonym.  He offered the song to 4 Star Records in Los Angeles, but was turned down, and Shibley decided to release the song on his own Mountain Dew label.  The record was credited to "Arkie Shibley and his Mountain Dew Boys", the line-up being Shibley on rhythm guitar, Leon Kelley on lead guitar, Jackie Hayes on bass and banjo, and Phil Fregon on fiddle.

The record became popular and was reissued on 4 Star's Gilt Edge imprint.  Shibley's record raced into the country charts in January 1951, peaking at No. 5, with cover versions on major labels by Ramblin' Jimmie Dolan on Capitol, Red Foley on Decca and Tiny Hill on Mercury.  The Hill version also crossed over to the pop charts (No. 29).

In 1951 Shibley recorded four sequels to his hit, all performed in a Woody Guthrie-like talking blues style: "Hot Rod Race # 2", "Arkie Meets the Judge (Hot Rod Race # 3)", "The Guy in the Mercury (Hot Rod Race # 4)" and "The Kid in the Model A (Hot Rod Race # 5)".  He subsequently disappeared into obscurity.  He died in Van Buren, Arkansas, in 1975.

"Hot Rod Race" prompted the even more successful answer song "Hot Rod Lincoln", a hit for Charlie Ryan (recorded 1955 and 1959, charted 1960, No. 33 pop), Johnny Bond (1960, No. 26 pop) and Commander Cody (1972, No. 9 pop).  Shibley's record also directly influenced Chuck Berry's "Maybellene", Gene Vincent's "Race With The Devil", and the succession of hot rod records by the Beach Boys and others in the early 1960s.

References

External links
 More information
 History of hot rod songs

Western swing performers
American country singer-songwriters
Four Star Records artists
Apex Records artists
1914 births
1975 deaths
20th-century American singers
Country musicians from Arkansas
Singer-songwriters from Arkansas